Ikechukwu Amaechi (born, 26 January 1967) is a Nigerian journalist, writer, columnist and an entrepreneur. He is the founder of TheNiche, an online newspaper publication organization. He hails from Ahiazu-Mbaise local government area of Imo State, Nigeria.

Early life and education

Biography
Ikechukwu Amaechi was born on January 26, 1967. He originally hails from Ekwereazu, a community in Ahiazu-Mbaise local government area of Imo State.  Born to a family of eight siblings, four boys and four girls, He is the first child in his family, he parents are Nze Alexander, Amadikwa Amaechi.
Ikechukwu's father is a salesman and public relations personal while his mother, Ezinne Appolonia Agbonma Amaechi, was a teacher.

Ikechukwu Amaechi is married for over 20 years to spouse, Chioma and has three children.

Educational background
He attended St. Peter's Primary School, where he obtained his First School Leaving Certificate in 1978. later attended Secondary Technical School, Obohia where he sat for his O’level exams in 1983. 
In 1987, he got his Nigerian Certificate in Education (NCE) from Alvan Ikoku Federal College of Education, Bachelor of Arts degree in Education/Government (B.A) from the University of Nigeria, Nsukka in 1990, Master of Science degree in Political Science from the University of Lagos, Akoka, Nigeria (1990); Master of Arts degree in International Journalism from the Cardiff University, Wales.

Career
Ikechukwu Amaechi is a Nigerian journalist. Prior to founding The Niche in 2014, Amaechi served as the editor of Daily Independent. He writes a regular column on Vanguard titled "Totally Real".

Awards
Ikechukwu Amaechi, was a member of the CNN, Multichoice African Journalist of the Year panel. Ikechukwu Amaechi was voted Editor of the Year in 2008 at the Nigerian Media Merit Awards (NMMA)

References

1967 births
Living people
Nigerian journalists
Nigerian columnists